Gramacho is a golf resort located to the east of Portimão in the Algarve region of Portugal. The resorts golf course was designed by Ronald Fream and Nick Price, and has hosted several prestigious tournaments, including the Ladies Open of Portugal on the Ladies European Tour.

Golf course

Scorecard

See also
 List of golf courses in Portugal

References

External links
Gramacho

Golf clubs and courses in Portugal
Buildings and structures in the Algarve